Chronidae is a family of air-breathing land slugs, terrestrial pulmonate gastropod mollusks in the superfamily Trochomorphoidea within the superorder Eupulmonata.

Distribution 
Distribution of Chronidae include eastern-Palearctic, Ethiopian, Madagascar, India, south-eastern Asia, Australian and Polynesian eco-regions.

Genera
Genera within the family Chronidae include:
 Antinous Robson, 1914
 Atrichoconcha Bartsch, 1942
 Bekkochlamys Habe, 1958
 Ceratochlamys Habe, 1946
 Chronos Robson, 1914 - type * of the family Chronidae
 Danjochlamys Y. Azuma & M. Azuma, 1993
 Exrhysota H. B. Baker, 1941
 Gastrodontella Möllendorff, 1901
 Glyptobensonia Möllendorff, 1894
 Hemiglypta Möllendorff, 1893
 Hemiglyptopsis Thiele, 1931
 Hemitrichiella Zilch, 1956
 Japanochlamys Habe, 1946
 Kaliella W. T. Blanford, 1863
 Lamarckiella Möllendorff, 1898
 Lepidotrichia Bartsch, 1942
 Macroceras C. Semper, 1870
 Nesokaliella Gerlach, 1998 - endemic to the Seychelles
 Nipponochlamys Habe, 1945
 Otesiopsis Habe, 1946
 Parakaliella Habe, 1946
 Pararyssota Bartsch, 1938
 Platymma Tomlin, 1938
 Ponapea H. B. Baker, 1941
 Pseudhelicarion Möllendorff, 1894
 Pseudokaliella Godwin-Austen, 1910
 Ryssota Albers, 1850
 Striokaliella Thiele, 1931
 Takemasaia Azuma & Minato, 1976
 Trichobensonia Möllendorff, 1902
 Trochochlamys Habe, 1946
 Trukrhysa H. B. Baker, 1941
 Vitrinoidea C. Semper, 1873
 Vitrinopsis C. Semper, 1873
 Yamatochlamys Habe, 1945
Synonyms
 Hemitrichia Möllendorff, 1888: synonym of Hemitrichiella Zilch, 1956 (Invalid: Junior homonym of Hemitrichia Rostafinski, 1873 [Myxomycetes]; Hemitrichiella is a replacement name)
 Rhysota Martens, 1860: synonym of Ryssota Albers, 1850 (unjustified emendation of the original name)
 Rhyssota auct.: synonym of Ryssota Albers, 1850 (invalid: unjustified emendation of the original name)

Cladogram 
The following cladogram shows the phylogenic relationships of this family with the other families within the limacoid clade:

References

 Bouchet P., Rocroi J.P., Hausdorf B., Kaim A., Kano Y., Nützel A., Parkhaev P., Schrödl M. & Strong E.E. (2017). Revised classification, nomenclator and typification of gastropod and monoplacophoran families. Malacologia. 61(1-2): 1-526.

External links
 Pfeffer, G. (1878). Beiträge zur Naturgeschichte der Schnecken. I. Die Naniniden. Jahrbücher der Deutschen Malakozoologischen Gesellschaft. 5: 251-276